German submarine U-642 was a Type VIIC U-boat built for Nazi Germany's Kriegsmarine for service during World War II.
She was laid down on 19 November 1941 by Blohm & Voss, Hamburg as yard number 618, launched on 6 August 1942 and commissioned on 1 October 1942 under Kapitänleutnant Herbert Brünning.

Design
German Type VIIC submarines were preceded by the shorter Type VIIB submarines. U-642 had a displacement of  when at the surface and  while submerged. She had two shafts and two  propellers.

U-642 was fitted with five  torpedo tubes (four fitted at the bow and one at the stern), fourteen torpedoes, one  SK C/35 naval gun, 220 rounds, and one twin  C/30 anti-aircraft gun. The boat had a complement of between forty-four and sixty.

Service history
The boat's career began with training at 5th U-boat Flotilla on 1 October 1942, followed by active service on 1 March 1943 as part of the 6th Flotilla. She transferred for operations in the Mediterranean on 1 December 1943 to serve with 29th Flotilla for the remainder of her service.

Wolfpacks
U-642 took part in nine wolfpacks, namely:
 Neuland (4 – 6 March 1943)
 Ostmark (6 – 11 March 1943)
 Stürmer (11 – 20 March 1943)
 Seewolf (21 – 30 March 1943)
 Oder (17 – 19 May 1943)
 Mosel (19 – 24 May 1943)
 Trutz (1 – 16 June 1943)
 Trutz 1 (16 – 29 June 1943)
 Geier 3 (30 June – 15 July 1943)

Fate
U-642 was sunk on 5 July 1944 in the Mediterranean at Military port of Toulon in position , by a US air raid.

Summary of raiding history

See also
 Mediterranean U-boat Campaign (World War II)

References

Bibliography

External links

German Type VIIC submarines
1942 ships
U-boats commissioned in 1942
U-boats sunk in 1944
U-boats sunk by US aircraft
World War II shipwrecks in the Mediterranean Sea
World War II submarines of Germany
Ships built in Hamburg
Maritime incidents in July 1944